Xiapu Station is an elevated metro station in Ningbo, Zhejiang, China. Xiapu Station is located on Taishan Road. Construction of the station started in December 2012, and service began on March 19, 2016.

Exits 

Xiapu Station has one exit.

References 

Railway stations in Zhejiang
Railway stations in China opened in 2016
Ningbo Rail Transit stations